Biga is a type of pre-fermentation used in Italian baking. Many popular Italian breads, including ciabatta, are made using a biga. Using a biga adds complexity to the bread's flavor and is often used in breads that need a light, open texture with holes. Apart from adding to flavor and texture, a biga also helps to preserve bread by making it less perishable.

Biga techniques were developed after the advent of baker's yeast as bakers in Italy moved away from the use of sourdough and needed to recover some of the flavor that was given up in this move. Bigas are usually dry and thick compared to a sourdough starter. This thickness is believed to give a Biga its characteristic slightly nutty taste. Biga is usually made fresh every day, using a small amount of baker's yeast in a thick dough, which varies from 45 to 90% hydration as a baker's percentage, and is allowed to ferment from 12 to 16 hours to fully develop its flavor.

For some home bakers, biga is used to refer to naturally leavened sourdough made with a stiff starter, without using baker's yeast.

See also
 Pre-ferment

References

External links 
The Artisan on indirect baking

Italian breads